Martim Carvalho Neto (born 14 January 2003) is a Portuguese footballer who plays as a midfielder for Benfica B in Liga Portugal 2.

Football career
He made his professional debut for Benfica B on 21 March 2021 in the Liga Portugal 2.

Honours
Benfica
Campeonato Nacional de Juniores: 2021–22
 UEFA Youth League: 2021–22
Under-20 Intercontinental Cup: 2022

References

External links

2003 births
Living people
People from Viana do Castelo
Portuguese footballers
Portugal youth international footballers
Association football midfielders
Liga Portugal 2 players
S.L. Benfica B players
Sportspeople from Viana do Castelo District